Henry Bruce (May 1905 – after 1939) was an English professional footballer who played in the Football League for Birmingham, Gillingham, Torquay United, Rochdale and Reading. He went on to manage Swedish club Halmstads BK.

Football career
Bruce was born in Coundon, near Bishop Auckland in County Durham. He played for Durham City, though not in the Football League, and for Bishop Auckland before joining Birmingham in January 1925. He made his debut in the First Division on 2 February 1925, deputising at right half for George Liddell in an away game at Burnley which Birmingham lost 3–2. He spent three-and-a-half years at the club, providing cover for all the defensive positions, before moving on to Gillingham of the Third Division South at the end of the 1927–28 season. He spent one season at Gillingham, playing 30 league games, followed by a season at Torquay United where he appeared 28 times in the league.

From July 1930 for the next 18 months or so, Bruce spent brief spells with a variety of clubs: Colwyn Bay United, Bankhead Albion back in his native north-east, Rochdale, where he played twice in the Third Division North in the 1930–31 season, Darlington, without appearing in the Football League, Bankhead Albion again, and finally Reading, where he played seven games in the Third Division South in 1931.

In 1937, he became the first non-Swedish manager of Halmstads BK, a post which he held until 1939. He retired from the game in 1939 or 1940.

Bruce died in Durham.

References

1905 births
Year of death missing
Sportspeople from Bishop Auckland
Footballers from County Durham
English footballers
Association football defenders
Durham City A.F.C. players
Bishop Auckland F.C. players
Birmingham City F.C. players
Gillingham F.C. players
Torquay United F.C. players
Colwyn Bay F.C. players
Rochdale A.F.C. players
Darlington F.C. players
Reading F.C. players
English Football League players
English football managers
Halmstads BK managers
People from Coundon